This is a list of awards received by Sechs Kies, a South Korean boy band who debuted under Daesung Entertainment in 1997. They are currently signed under YG Entertainment.

Awards

External links
Official Site
YG Entertainment

Sechs Kies
Awards
SechsKies